Inga bella is a species of plant in the family Fabaceae. It is found only in Costa Rica.

References

bella
Flora of Costa Rica
Endangered plants
Taxonomy articles created by Polbot
Plants described in 1993